The 1957 NAIA basketball tournament was held in March at Municipal Auditorium in Kansas City, Missouri. The 20th annual NAIA basketball tournament featured 32 teams playing in a single-elimination format. 

This would be the first tournament to have seeded teams. This also means that this is the first tournament to have an 'upset'. The first upset in tournament history was when the 3 seeded West Virginia Tech lost to Villa Madonna, predecessor to today's Thomas More of Kentucky, 93–91. There were three upsets this year, including the championship game. The NAIA seeded teams 21 years prior to the NCAA Division I men's basketball tournament. The NAIA would adjust seeding to 16 seed system, in 1959. In 2016 the seeds would be adjust again, each bracket would be ranked 1-8, with the overall number 1 in the Naismith Bracket. 

The championship game featured Tennessee State and Southeastern State (OK). With Tennessee State's win, they became the first historically black institution to win a collegiate basketball national championship. This would be the first of three national championship titles for Tennessee State.

The 3rd place game featured Pacific Lutheran defeating Eastern Illinois.

Awards and honors
Many of the records set by the 1957 tournament have been broken, and many of the awards were established much later:
Leading scorer est. 1963
Leading rebounder est. 1963
Charles Stevenson Hustle Award est. 1958
Player of the Year est. 1994
Most free throws made; career: 120 free throws made by Jim Spivey of Southeastern Oklahoma State (1954,55,56,57).
Most free throws made; single-game, team: 48, Southeastern Oklahoma State vs. Southwest Texas State
Most free throws made in one tournament; individual: 68 free throws made by Jim Spivey of Southeastern Oklahoma State (1954,55,56,57).
Most free throws made in one tournament; team: 153, Southeastern Oklahoma State
Most consecutive tournament victories; record start: 18 overall, 5 in 1957, Tennessee State, 1957-58-59-60
Top single-game performances: Jim Spivey, 4th, Southeastern Oklahoma State vs. Eastern Illinois, 20 field goals, 13 free throws and 53 total points; Jim Spivey 13th, Southeastern Oklahoma State vs Southwest Texas State, 14 field goals, 18 free throws and 46 total points; Jim Spivey 20th, Southeastern Oklahoma State vs. Tennessee State, 14 field goals 15 free throws and 43 total points.
All-time leading scorer; first appearance: Charles Sharp, 5th Southwest Texas State (1957,59,60) 12 games, 118 field goals, 69 free throws, 305 total points, 25.4 average per game
All-time leading scorers; second appearance: Dick Barnett, 3rd, Tennessee State (1956,57,58,59) 18 games, 186 field goals, 79 free throws, 451 total points 25.1 average per game, Charles Curtis, 8th, Pacific Lutheran (Wash.) (1956,57,58,59) 14 games 101 field goals,  85 free throws, 287 total points, 20.5 average per game, Roger Iverson, 20th, Pacific Lutheran (1956,57,58,59) 14 games, 109 field goals, 23 free throws, 241 total points, 17.2 average per game, and John Barnhill, 21st, Tennessee State (1956,57,58,59) 17 games, 104 field goals, 27 free throws, 235 total points, 13.8 average per game.
All-time leading scorer; third appearance: Bennie Swain, 6th Texas Southern (1955,56,57,58) 15 games, 119 field goals, 64 free throws, 302 total points, 20.1 average per game.
All-time leading scorer; final appearance: James Spivey, 4th, Southeastern Oklahoma (1954,55,56,57) 13 games, 133 field goals, 120 free throws, 386 total points, 29.7 average per game.

Bracket

 denotes overtime

See also
 1957 NCAA University Division basketball tournament
 1957 NCAA College Division basketball tournament
 1957 National Invitation Tournament

References

NAIA Men's Basketball Championship
Tournament
NAIA men's basketball tournament
NAIA men's basketball tournament